No Hard Feelings is a German drama film, directed by Faraz Shariat and released in 2020. The film stars Benjamin Radjaipour as Parvis, a confidently out but immature gay young man of Iranian descent living in Germany, who commits a minor criminal infraction and is sentenced to perform community service at a refugee detention centre, where he falls in love with new immigrant Amon (Eidin Jalali).

The film premiered at the 2020 Berlin Film Festival, where it won the Teddy Award for best LGBTQ-themed feature film. At the 2020 Inside Out Film and Video Festival, it was named the winner of the award for Best First Feature Film.

Plot 
Parvis is the son of exiled Iranians and lives with his parents in Hildesheim. He enjoys freedoms that many young Germans can only dream of. His parents accept that he's gay, and he enjoys Grindr dates and late club nights. After being shoplifted, he has to do his 120 hours of community service as a translator in a housing project for refugees. There he is initially eyed strangely because he looks strange with his bleached hair and is not very skilful with some tasks. He also takes part in the talks in which decisions are to be made about their further stay, and translates intentionally incorrectly in order to prevent their deportation.

He meets the Iranian refugee Amon, who is waiting there with his sister Banafshe for their residence permits. Amon is asked by the other young men in the project not to have any contact with the oddball. Amon doesn't immediately understand that Parvis isn't a resident of the project, he's only there for his community service. Amon shares a room with his sister, who quickly notices that her brother likes Parvis and helps them get closer. After a night of partying together, the three go to his house together. Amon helps the completely drunk Parvis bathe, and a first kiss follows. Banafshe learns from her mother the background to her flight and what the new start in Germany was like for her back then. Later she tells her son that they set it all up in Germany just for him. 

A project worker recommends a protective marriage to Banafshe because she is threatened with deportation and immediately offers to marry her. On the day that Parvis works on the project for the last time, Banafshe is warned that the police are on their way to arrange for her deportation. She wants to leave the project, but Parvis gets her and her brother out of town first.

References

External links
 

2020 films
2020s coming-of-age drama films
2020 LGBT-related films
Gay-related films
German coming-of-age drama films
German LGBT-related films
LGBT-related drama films
LGBT-related coming-of-age films
2020s German-language films
2020 drama films
Films about LGBT and Islam
2020s German films